Bushey Hall was the name of two historic buildings in Hertfordshire.

Bushey Hall may also refer to:
Bushey Hall School, former name of The Grange Academy
Bushey Hall Golf Club

Architectural disambiguation pages